Simeon Alexander Jackson (born March 28, 1987) is a Canadian professional soccer player who currently plays as a forward for Chelmsford City.

He has spent the majority of his career playing in England, relocating from Mississauga, Ontario, to South London as a teenager to pursue his interest in football. Following a rejection by Gillingham after a trial, he played semi-professionally before making his name with Rushden & Diamonds of the Football Conference. His goalscoring feats for the club earned him a move to Gillingham, then of League Two, in 2008. He scored the winning goal for the club in the 2009 League Two Play-Off Final at Wembley Stadium.

In 2010 Jackson was transferred to Norwich City, then of the Championship, and scored the goal that clinched Norwich's promotion to the Premier League the following year. He fell out of favour at the club during the 2012–13 season, and opted to join German club Eintracht Braunschweig who were newly promoted to the Bundesliga. Desiring regular playing time, his contract with the German club was mutually terminated in January 2014 and he returned to England with Millwall.

After spells with Coventry City, Barnsley, Blackburn Rovers, Walsall and Grimsby Town, Jackson signed for Scottish club St Mirren in September 2018. He then joined another Scottish club, Kilmarnock, in October 2019.

Born in Jamaica, Jackson has played for the Canadian national team since 2009. During qualification for the 2014 FIFA World Cup he scored a hat-trick against Saint Lucia.

Club career

Early years
Jackson started his career with his local team in Canada, Sunoco FC. He was invited to have trials with Gillingham, but was rejected by the club. At the age of 15, he moved to England and lived with his grandmother in Croydon, South London. While playing for Dulwich Hamlet, Jackson worked at McDonald's to sustain his move to England.

Rushden & Diamonds
Jackson joined Rushden & Diamonds in 2004 and was the club's top scorer in the 2006–07 season, scoring 20 goals. The next season, he was top scorer for the Diamonds in the league, scoring 16 goals, despite leaving for Gillingham in January. He was joint eighth top scorer in the league that season. In 2005, he had trials with Manchester United and Manchester City. Jackson went on a one-month loan to Raunds Town in December 2005. When he left the Diamonds he had established himself as the club's eighth highest goalscorer, scoring 43 goals in just over 100 games in all competitions.

Gillingham
In January 2008, Jackson signed with Gillingham, a club he had a trial with as a youth player, for a transfer fee of £150,000 on a three-and-a-half-year contract. He made his debut against Cheltenham Town on February 2, 2008.

On January 4, 2009, Jackson scored an equalizing goal for Gillingham in their 2–1 FA Cup Third Round defeat by Aston Villa. He scored both goals as Gillingham beat Rochdale in the 2008–09 play-off semi final, and the 90th-minute winner in the 1–0 win against Shrewsbury Town in the final, as Gillingham returned to League One one year after relegation.

Norwich City

Jackson signed for Norwich in July 2010, signing a two-year contract with the club, with the option for another year, in a deal which saw striker Cody McDonald move to Gillingham on loan. He was given the number 10 jersey upon his arrival at the club and made his debut in a 3–2 home loss to Watford on August 6, 2010. He scored his first goal for the club against Swansea City on August 21. Manager Paul Lambert often used Jackson as an impact substitute due to the form and partnership of Grant Holt and Chris Martin. Jackson was given a start against Bristol City, and scored a brace, with a goal in each half at Ashton Gate. Jackson started the next four games again, in favour of Martin. He scored his fourth goal of the season in the 1–0 win over Middlesbrough on October 23. After a few months of mostly coming in as a substitute again, on April 2, 2011, Jackson scored his first hat-trick for Norwich, coming on as a substitute and scoring three times in the last twenty minutes of the match against Scunthorpe United at Carrow Road. He went on to score the goal that clinched Norwich's promotion to the Premier League, a late winner against Portsmouth.

Jackson made his Premier League debut on August 21, 2011, as a second-half substitute for Chris Martin in the second game of the season against Stoke City, the game finished with a Kenwyne Jones stoppage time header which resulted in a 1–1 home draw for Norwich.

Following his Premier League debut, Jackson began to struggle finding minutes in the team, he did not play a minute of football in the league until October 1 as a second half sub against Manchester United. Jackson made his first start in the Premier League on November 26 in a 2–1 victory over Queens Park Rangers, this was the first time a Canadian international had started in the Premier League since David Edgar on May 24, 2009 with Burnley. Jackson scored his first Premier League goal on December 20 against Wolverhampton Wanderers when he converted a Steve Morison cross one minute after being subbed on. Jackson came on as a second half sub against Fulham on December 31 and scored the game tying goal in second half injury time to earn a 1–1 home draw. In the fourth round of the FA Cup in late January Norwich was drawn against West Bromwich Albion, Jackson came off the bench in the 65th minute with the game being tied at 1–1 and scored the winning goal in the 85th to take the Canaries into the fifth round. After failing to make an appearance for almost a month Jackson returned to the starting line up in a 3–3 away draw on 5 May against Arsenal. The following week, Jackson was given the start again in the final game of the season against Aston Villa, the game ended in a 2–0 home victory with Jackson and Grant Holt as the scorers. Jackson finished the 2011–12 campaign for Norwich having made 22 appearances, starting in 10 of those. He scored three goals and registered two assists, with 34 shots on goal in his debut Premier League season. The club took up the option to extend Jackson's contract for another year in June 2012, along with David Fox and Elliott Ward. On August 25, 2012 he scored his first goal of the new season in a 1–1 draw at home to Queens Park Rangers. At the end of the season, Jackson was released by Norwich, having struggled to find minutes during his second year in the top flight.

Eintracht Braunschweig
On July 10, 2013, Jackson signed for German Bundesliga side Eintracht Braunschweig on a two-year contract. Jackson was previously linked with a move to Championship side AFC Bournemouth. After just nine appearances during the first half of the season, Jackson and Eintracht Braunschweig mutually agreed to terminate his contract on January 31, 2014.

Return to England
On February 1, 2014, a day after his Eintracht Braunschweig contract was terminated, Jackson agreed to join Championship side Millwall on a deal until the end of the season. He made his debut against Brighton & Hove Albion on March 1, 2014. Jackson scored his first goal on March 25 in a 3–2 home defeat to Birmingham City.

On August 18, 2014, Jackson signed for League One team Coventry City on a one-year contract. On September 13 Jackson scored his first goal for the club and the game-winning goal in a 2–1 victory over Yeovil Town.

After leaving Coventry at the end of the 2014–15 season, Jackson went on trial at fellow League One side Barnsley. On September 3, 2015, he signed a short-term contract to keep him at the club until January 3, 2016.

Following a successful trial, Jackson signed a short-term deal with Blackburn Rovers on January 15, 2016 to last until the end of the 2015–16 season. He scored his first goal for Blackburn in a 2–1 defeat to Leeds United on March 12, 2016.

Jackson signed for Walsall on July 18, 2016, and scored twice on his debut for Walsall in a 3–1 win over AFC Wimbledon on August 6, 2016. In January 2018 he joined Grimsby Town on loan for the remainder of the 2017–18 season.

He was released by Walsall at the end of the 2017–18 season.

St Mirren
Jackson went on to a trial spell with Scottish Premiership club St Mirren in September 2018 and was signed on a short-term deal through January 2019. He left Saints when his contract expired in June 2019, having helped the club avoid relegation.

Kilmarnock
Jackson signed a short-term contract with Scottish Premiership club Kilmarnock in October 2019. Jackson left after the expiration of his contract in December 2019.

Stevenage
On January 20, 2020, Jackson signed a six-month deal for Stevenage. After only five appearances in all competitions Jackson was released by the club at the conclusion of the 2019–20 season.

Chelmsford City
On February 5, 2021, Jackson signed for National League South club Chelmsford City. On March 5, 2021, Jackson signed for National League club King's Lynn Town on loan until the end of the 2020–21 season. On July 3, 2021, Chelmsford confirmed Jackson would be returning to the club for the 2021–22 season, taking up a head of coaching role and a community ambassador role alongside his playing responsibilities.

International career

Jackson qualified for Canadian citizenship by virtue of his years of residence there as a child, and currently has 45 caps for Canada, scoring six times. He also has seven caps for the Canadian men's youth (under-20) team. His first game was a friendly against Brazil in May 2006, and he played in all three of Canada's games at the 2007 U-20 World Cup, his last games at that level. On November 14, 2008, he received his first call up for the Canadian senior squad for a match against his country of birth, Jamaica.

On May 30, 2009, Jackson made his debut for Canada against Cyprus, scoring the winning goal in the 53rd minute of a 1–0 victory. Jackson helped Canada reach the quarter-final stage of the 2009 CONCACAF Gold Cup in the US, playing in all four of Canada's games in the tournament. On December 18, 2009, Jackson was named the Canadian Player of the Year.

National team coach Stephen Hart decided in the friendly versus Peru to experiment by using Jackson as a right winger. With a solid performance at BMO Field Hart continued to use Jackson out wide for future Canada match ups. On October 8, 2010, Jackson scored his second international goal with a chip in a friendly against Ukraine. On October 7, 2011, Jackson scored a hat-trick against Saint Lucia in a game that finished in a 7–0 away victory for Canada. Jackson became only the second ever Canadian to score a hat-trick in World Cup qualifying joining the former striker Alex Bunbury. In early December, Jackson was shortlisted for the 2011 Canadian Player of the Year along with Dwayne De Rosario and Josh Simpson, it was announced on December 14 that he had finished in second place losing out to De Rosario.

In the summer of 2013, Jackson was selected for his third consecutive Gold Cup, but after playing in the first group stage game against Martinique he left with the team's blessing to join his new German club and was replaced by Kyle Porter for the remainder of the tournament.

Personal life
Jackson was born in Kingston, Jamaica. At the age of three, he moved with his parents to Mississauga, Ontario.

Commercial interests
On June 1, 2011, it was announced by Umbro that Jackson had signed an endorsement deal following the new partnership between the English sportswear company and the Canadian Soccer Association, making Jackson one of the few Canadian players to have an endorsement deal. In 2012, Jackson revealed that "he plans to fulfil a long-held dream next year when he sets up his first 'soccer' school in Southern Ontario ... "I want to help kids in Canada improve themselves, and get the opportunity to play in Europe and at the highest level through a soccer school."

Career statistics

Club

International

International goals
Canada score listed first, score column indicates score after each Jackson goal

Honours
Gillingham
Football League Two play-offs: 2009

Individual

Canadian Player of the Year: 2009
Canada Soccer Player of the Month: January 2012
Championship Player of the Month: April 2011

References

External links

Player Profile – Simeon Jackson Norwich FC (Archived)

1987 births
Canadian soccer players
Jamaican emigrants to Canada
Naturalized citizens of Canada
Association football forwards
Canada men's international soccer players
2009 CONCACAF Gold Cup players
2011 CONCACAF Gold Cup players
2013 CONCACAF Gold Cup players
2015 CONCACAF Gold Cup players
Rushden & Diamonds F.C. players
Gillingham F.C. players
Norwich City F.C. players
Coventry City F.C. players
Barnsley F.C. players
Blackburn Rovers F.C. players
Walsall F.C. players
Grimsby Town F.C. players
Eintracht Braunschweig players
St Mirren F.C. players
Kilmarnock F.C. players
Stevenage F.C. players
Chelmsford City F.C. players
King's Lynn Town F.C. players
Chelmsford City F.C. non-playing staff
National League (English football) players
English Football League players
Premier League players
Bundesliga players
Scottish Professional Football League players
Expatriate footballers in England
Expatriate footballers in Germany
Canadian expatriate soccer players
Canadian expatriate sportspeople in England
Canadian expatriate sportspeople in Germany
Canada men's youth international soccer players
Black Canadian soccer players
Sportspeople from Kingston, Jamaica
Soccer players from Mississauga
Living people
Expatriate footballers in Scotland
Canadian expatriate sportspeople in Scotland
Association football coaches